Coach Prime is an American television documentary series about college football head coach Deion Sanders. It premiered on Prime Video on December 29, 2022.

Summary
The docuseries follows Deion Sanders (nicknamed "Prime Time"), head coach of the Jackson State University Tigers football team, on and off the field. During the team's 2022 undefeated SWAC championship season, the team had to contend with a water crisis in Jackson, Mississippi, with players moving to different locations, and Sanders guiding them through the crisis.

Cast
 Deion Sanders
 Shedeur Sanders
 Andre' Hart
 Trevor Reilly
 De'Jahn Warren
 Shilo Sanders
 Gary Harrell
 Isaiah Bolden
 Aubrey Miller Jr.
 Travis Hunter
 Anthony Balancier

Production
Coach Prime was originally launched by SMAC Entertainment in 2021 as a six-episode documentary series following Deion Sanders in his first year as head coach of the Jackson State Tigers, airing on Barstool Sports' YouTube channel starting on August 29, 2021. A second six-episode season was released on Barstool on March 6, 2022.

On October 12, 2022, Coach Prime was announced as a four-part docuseries that would premiere on Prime Video in December 2022. The docuseries is produced by Prime Video Sports and SMAC Productions, and executive produced by Michael Strahan, Constance Schwartz-Morini and FredAnthony Smith. Michael Gleaton is showrunner and executive producer.

Seasons

Release
The official trailer was released on December 15, 2022. The first two parts of the four-part docuseries premiered on Prime Video on December 29, 2022.

References

External links 
 

English-language television shows
Amazon Prime Video original programming
2020s American documentary television series
Documentary television series about sports
Television shows filmed in Mississippi
Jackson State Tigers football